Luís Augusto Martins Rocha (born 27 June 1993) is a Portuguese professional footballer who plays mainly as a left-back but also as a left winger for Super League Greece 2 club Chania.

Club career
Born in the village of Gavião in Vila Nova de Famalicão, Braga District, Rocha began his development at hometown club F.C. Famalicão and concluded it at Vitória de Guimarães. He made his professional debut for the latter's reserves on 12 July 2012 as they began their history with a Segunda Liga goalless home draw against S.C. Covilhã, as an 80th-minute substitute for Diogo Lamelas. He also took part that season for the first team in the Primeira Liga, and made one appearance in their winning of the Taça de Portugal, the 2–0 semi-final away victory over C.F. Os Belenenses.

Rocha extended his contract on 25 July 2013, until 2017. He scored his first goal on 14 February 2015 to open a 4–0 home rout of Atlético Clube de Portugal for the reserves, and his first in the top flight was the following 6 January in a 4–3 win at Moreirense FC.

On 27 May 2016, Rocha ended his 13-year association with Vitória and signed a three-year deal with Panetolikos F.C. in Greece. After two and a half years in Super League Greece, he switched countries again to Legia Warsaw of Poland, managed by compatriot Ricardo Sá Pinto. He and fellow Portuguese André Martins were Ekstraklasa champions at the end of the 2019–20 campaign.

Honours
Vitória de Guimarães
Taça de Portugal: 2012–13

Legia Warsaw
Ekstraklasa: 2019–20, 2020–21

References

External links

1993 births
Living people
People from Vila Nova de Famalicão
Sportspeople from Braga District
Portuguese footballers
Association football defenders
Association football wingers
Primeira Liga players
Liga Portugal 2 players
Campeonato de Portugal (league) players
Vitória S.C. B players
Vitória S.C. players
Super League Greece players
Super League Greece 2 players
Panetolikos F.C. players
Ekstraklasa players
III liga players
Legia Warsaw players
MKS Cracovia (football) players
Portugal youth international footballers
Portuguese expatriate footballers
Expatriate footballers in Greece
Expatriate footballers in Poland
Portuguese expatriate sportspeople in Greece
Portuguese expatriate sportspeople in Poland